Kim Lake is a lake located on Vancouver Island east of Tsable Lake, south of Cumberland.

References

Alberni Valley
Lakes of Vancouver Island
Nelson Land District